Paul Joseph LaCamera (born September 4, 1963) is a United States Army four-star general and infantry officer who serves as commander of the United Nations Command, ROK/US Combined Forces Command and United States Forces Korea since July 2, 2021. LaCamera most recently served as commanding general of United States Army Pacific from November 18, 2019 to June 3, 2021. He previously served as the commanding general of XVIII Airborne Corps. His other assignments include the commander of Combined Joint Task Force – Operation Inherent Resolve and as the commanding general of the 4th Infantry Division. LaCamera is a native of Westwood, Massachusetts. He was nominated to replace General Robert Abrams as the next commander of United Nations Command, R.O.K.-U.S. Combined Forces Command, and U.S. Forces Korea, on December 2, 2020, however his nomination was returned to the president on January 3, 2021, without action. He was renominated on April 27, 2021.

Military career

LaCamera was commissioned a second lieutenant upon graduation from the United States Military Academy in 1985. He served as rifle platoon leader with C Company, 3d Battalion (Airborne), 504th Infantry, 82nd Airborne Division. Later he served as Company commander, 4th Ranger Training Battalion, Ranger Training Brigade, Operations Officer, 1st Battalion, 506th Infantry, 2d Infantry Division and Executive Officer, 1st Battalion, 75th Ranger Regiment. From February 2001 to May 2003, he commanded the 1st Battalion, 87th Infantry Regiment, 10th Mountain Division (Light), which deployed as part of Operation Anaconda to Afghanistan. LaCamera then took command of the 3d Battalion, 75th Ranger Regiment at Fort Benning, Georgia from June 2003 to May 2004. Lacamera graduated from College of Naval Warfare, Naval War College located at Newport, Rhode Island in June 2005 before taking command of the 75th Ranger Regiment from August 2005 to August 2007. Following this command, he became the Director of Operations, Joint Special Operations Command from 2007 to 2009. In 2009, he became the Assistant Commanding General, Joint Special Operations Command. From 2010 to 2012, LaCamera served as the Deputy Commanding General (Operations), 25th Infantry Division. He later served as commanding general XVIII Airborne Corps and commander of Combined Joint Task Force-Operation Inherent Resolve.

Family
LaCamera's sister Trese is a retired U.S. Army lieutenant colonel who was the wife of Major general Jeffrey L. Bannister.

Training and education
LaCamera earned a Bachelor of Science degree from the United States Military Academy and a Master of Arts in National Security and Strategic Studies from the United States Army War College. His military education includes the Infantry Officer Basic and Advanced Courses, the Army Command and General Staff College, the Army War College, the Naval War College, and the Senior Service College Fellowship Course.

Awards and decorations

References

1963 births
Living people
United States Military Academy alumni
United States Army War College alumni
United States Army personnel of the Iraq War
United States Army personnel of the War in Afghanistan (2001–2021)
Colonels of the 75th Ranger Regiment
Recipients of the Defense Distinguished Service Medal
Recipients of the Distinguished Service Medal (US Army)
Recipients of the Defense Superior Service Medal
Recipients of the Legion of Merit
Recipients of the Silver Star
Commanders, United States Forces Korea
United States Army generals